Robert Savage is a racing driver from County Meath, Ireland.

In 2015 Robert won Irish Touring Cars Championship in Super Touring 2.0 class.

References

Living people
Irish racing drivers
Year of birth missing (living people)
Sportspeople from County Meath